Ramseh-ye Do (also known as Ţarrāḩ-e Mollā ‘Abūdī-ye Do) is a village in Tarrah Rural District, Hamidiyeh District, Ahvaz County, Khuzestan Province, Iran. At the 2006 census, its population was 273, in 26 families.

References 

Populated places in Ahvaz County